The Ministry of Economy and Planning is a department of the Tunisian Government. It was created in October 2021 by the Bouden Cabinet.

Ministers 

 Samir Saïed

References 

Government ministries of Tunisia
2021 establishments in Tunisia
Ministries established in 2021
Economy ministries